Gohpur (IPA: ˌgəʊəˈpʊə) is a town and headquarter of Gohpur sub-division in SONITPUR district in the Indian state of Assam. It is a historical place of Assam, where the famous freedom fighter Kanaklata Barua was born. The current MLA from the Gohpur constituency is Utpal Borah and Dipan Barman, ACS is the current Sub Divisional Officer (Civil) or Civil SDO of Gohpur.

Geography
It has an average elevation of 269 m (883 feet). The distance between Guwahati and Gohpur is 299 km by road and 266 km by train; aerial distance is 208 km. Gohpur also connects Itanagar, capital of Arunachal Pradesh, via NH 15. Itanagar is only 31 km from Gohpur via NH 52A. It also connects to Majuli and Jorhat by small ships through the Brahmaputra.

Demographics
 India census, Gohpur had a population of 121,380. Males constitute 53% of the population and females 47%. Gohpur has an average literacy rate of 72%, higher than the national average of 59.5%: male literacy is 77%, and female literacy is 66%. In Gohpur, 13% of the population is under 6 years of age.

Politics
Gohpur is part of Tezpur Lok Sabha constituency.
The Gohpur Assembly Constituency is one of the largest in Assam, spreading from Buroi to Hawajan along the North Bank of Assam. Utpal Borah is the MLA from Gohpur. Pallab Lochan Das is the MP of Tezpur Lok Sabha constituency.

References

Cities and towns in Biswanath district
Biswanath district